San Dieguito River Park is a greenway of   in San Diego County, California, United States. The park is a joint powers authority comprising the county of San Diego and cities of Del Mar, Escondido, Poway, San Diego, and Solana Beach. 

Open space within the park is a home to multiple species, including 230 birds. Coastal sage scrub habitat includes Least Bell's Vireo, Cactus wren, California gnatcatcher and San Diego horned lizard.

A restoration project in the San Dieguito lagoon was completed in 2011 at the cost of 86 million dollars.

References

External links

 Official park website

Parks in San Diego County, California